Komlos or Komlós is a surname. Notable people with the surname include: 

János Komlós (mathematician) (born 1942), Hungarian-American mathematician,
János Komlós (writer) (1922–1980), Hungarian writer, journalist, and stand-up comedian 
John Komlos (born 1944), American economic historian
Juci Komlós (1919–2011), Hungarian film actress
Marianna Komlos (1969–2004), Canadian bodybuilder
Péter Komlós (1935–2017), Hungarian violinist